State Route 272 (SR 272) is a  long north-south state highway located entirely within Marshall County in Middle Tennessee.

Route description

SR 272 begins at an intersection with SR 129 in the community of Archer. It winds its way north as a two-lane highway through mountains for several miles before passing through farmland to enter Lewisburg, where it comes to an intersection and becomes concurrent with US 31A/SR 106. They bypass downtown as a four-lane undivided highway along the east side, where they pass through both residential and business areas and become concurrent with US 431 at an intersection with US 431 Business/SR 50. The highway then curves to the northwest to cross a bridge over a creek before coming to an intersection with US 31A Business/US 431 Business/SR 11, where US 31A and SR 272 split from US 431/SR 106 to follow SR 11 north. SR 272 splits off shortly thereafter and leaves Lewisburg to pass through a mix of farmland and wooded areas as a two-lane highway for the next several miles, where it passes through the community of Verona. The highway then crosses a bridge over the Duck River shortly before coming to an end at an intersection with SR 99 just a few miles southwest of Chapel Hill.

Major intersections

References

272
Transportation in Marshall County, Tennessee